Kenneth Yamada is an American biologist at the National Institutes of Health and an Elected Fellow of the American Association for the Advancement of Science.

Dr. Yamada's research focuses on discovering novel mechanisms and regulators of cell interactions with the extracellular matrix and their roles in craniofacial development and disease.

References

Year of birth missing (living people)
Living people
Fellows of the American Association for the Advancement of Science
21st-century American biologists
Stanford University alumni